The Tinella, the principal tributary of the Belbo, is a minor stream of Piedmont in northwestern Italy whose course falls entirely within the Province of Cuneo.

Geography 
Its sources are a number of springs in the hills near Trezzo Tinella. For  it follows a narrow and confined course through the Langhe, making a broad arc to the south-east, then joins the Belbo above Santo Stefano Belbo.

Regime 
Its regime is typical of a small Apeninne torrent: its discharge—normally very modest—can turn to a violent flood in the event of heavy precipitation.

Sources

Other projects

Rivers of Italy
Rivers of the Province of Cuneo
Langhe